Jean Biès (1933 – 11 January 2014) was a French philosopher and author. He is the recipient of the High Prize of the Society of French Poets (1970), Chevalier of the French Legion of Honor (1997), and a prolific modern proponent of the Traditionalist School. His works deal with the union of Eastern and Western philosophy.

Biography
Born in Bordeaux, France in 1933, much of his childhood and adolescence was spent in Algiers. Jean Biès studied Classics at the University of Algiers before continuing his studies at the Sorbonne. His doctoral dissertation, which studied the relationship between French literature and Hindu thought (Littérature française et la Pensée Hindoue), was awarded the Prix d’Asie by the Académie des sciences d'outre-mer.

Coming across the writings of René Guénon in 1951, Biès discovered the existence of initiatory teachings. This had a large influence on his beliefs and writings and he went on to meet several prominent members of the Traditionalist School including Frithjof Schuon.

He was awarded the Chevalier of the French Legion of Honor in 1997.

After the loss of his wife, the Jungian analyst Rolande Biès in January 2012, Jean Biès committed suicide in January 2014.

Writings
Biès has written extensively on the subject of traditional wisdom and his works take many forms including essays, poetry, travel accounts, personal testimonies, and scholarly articles. He retired in 1993 so he could focus his time entirely on his writing. In 2004 World Wisdom published the first English-language collection of his writings, entitled Returning to the Essential: The Selected Writings of Jean Bies.

The Catholic philosopher Jean Borella referred to Biès as "one of the great and most authentic poets of our time".

See also

 Traditionalist School
 René Guénon

Bibliography
English
Sophia Volume 12 Number 1 (Foundation for Traditional Studies, 2007) 
Ye Shall Know the Truth (World Wisdom, 2005) 
Returning to the Essential: The Selected Writings of Jean Bies (World Wisdom, 2004) 

French
John Tavener, l'enchanteur : Une introduction à la musique du silence (Les Deux Océans, 2008) 
Les alchimistes (OXUS, 2007) 
Petit dictionnaire d'impertinences spirituelles (Entrelacs, 2006) 
Voies de Sages : Douze maîtres spirituels témoignent de leur vérité (OXUS, 2006) 
Les grands initiés du XXe siècle : Trente voies pratiques de réalisation (OXUS, 2005) 
Retour à l'essentiel : Quelle spiritualité pour l'homme d'aujourd'hui? (L'Age d'Homme, 2004) 
Vivre et transmettre la tradition (Dervy, 2004) 
Par les chemins de vie et d'oeuvre : Entretiens avec Mireya de Alson (Les Deux Océans, 2001) 
Littérature française et pensée hindoue, des origines à 1950 (Klincksieck, 2000) 
Les Alchimistes (Kiron: Philippe Lebaud, 2000) 
Athos: La montagne transfigurée (Deux Océans, 2000) 
La Porte de l'appartement des femmes (Dauphin (Le), 1998) 
L'initiatrice (Editions du Dauphin, 1998) 
Voies de sages (Editions du Felin, 1996) 
Paroles d'urgence (Terre du Ciel, 1996) 
Les chemins de la ferveur : Voyage en Inde (Terre du Ciel, 1995) 
Arts, gnose et alchimie. Trois sources de régénérescence (Courrier du Livre, 1987)

References

External links
Jean Biès’s life and work
The Notebooks of Jean Biès

1933 births
2014 deaths
Writers from Bordeaux
Traditionalist School
20th-century French poets
Mystic poets
20th-century French philosophers
21st-century French philosophers
21st-century French writers
Chevaliers of the Légion d'honneur
French male poets
20th-century French male writers
French male non-fiction writers
2014 suicides
Suicides in France